Mullaippāṭṭu (lit. "the forest or jungle song") is an ancient Tamil poem in the Sangam literature. Authored by Napputanar, it is the shortest poem in the Ten Idylls (Pattuppāṭṭu) anthology, consisting of 103 lines in akaval meter. It is largely an akam-genre (love) poem about a wife in grief when her husband does not return from the war front, when he promised he will. The Mullaippattu weaves her sorrow with her attempts at patience and self-control. The poem was likely composed about 230 CE or slightly later, according to Kamil Zvelebil – a Tamil literature scholar.

The title of the poem Mullaippattu refers to the creeper mullai (jasmine) that carries sweet-smelling flowers in the jungles of South India, states Chelliah. It metonymically connotes the jungle home and sweet wife a warrior chieftain left when he went on his military campaign. He promised to return before the rains. The rains have come, are falling abundantly, but neither has her husband returned nor a word about him has come. She is worried and in grief. She and her maids pray in a temple for his return, make offerings. They seek omens and words of guess. She tries to be patient but can hide her sorrow. The poem alternates lines painting her in her cycles of emotions. Then, she hears the trumpeting approach of victorious troupes, signaling the return of her husband. She is filled with joy.

The poem is "one of the most beautiful of the Pattuppattu songs, states Zvelebil. The akam portions of the poem paint the lover's anguish, while the puram portions describe the temporary military camp of the chieftain in the jungle. The chieftain is reflecting on the loss of life, the injured soldiers and the crippled elephants in previous military campaigns. His wife is worried about him. The two portions – akam and puram – are woven together in the form of a mattu (linking) for a contrasting impact. The 14th-century scholar Naccinarkkiniyar wrote a commentary on this poem.

The Mullaippattu is a source of historical and social information. It is notable for its mention of yavanas (Greek-Romans, lines 61, 73–83) as part of the troupes in the Tamil kingdom's army. It describes their dress, uses the word mileccar for them, and calls them the bodyguard of the king. The yavanas can't speak the local language and communicate using gestures, states Mullaippattu. The mahouts (riders) of the elephants are described as "speaking the northern language". The military camp is described as camouflaged, tents covered with leaves, and the entire camp surrounded by thorny cover. The poem mentions water clock, different variety of flowers in the jungle, and warriors going into battle wearing a garland of flowers.

The short poem mentions the Hindu god Vishnu through an elaborate simile. It also mentions the goddess of wealth, Lakshmi in lines 6–7, to whom the women pray for the return of the warriors. Lines 46–47 of Mullaippattu mentions Brahmin yogis in ochre-colored clothes carrying three staves. The poem has about 500 words, predominantly Tamil. It has 13 Sanskrit loan words and 2 non-Tamil provincial words.

See also
 Pattuppāṭṭu
 Sangam literature

References

Bibliography

 
 Mudaliyar, Singaravelu A., Apithana Cintamani, An encyclopaedia of Tamil Literature, (1931) - Reprinted by Asian Educational Services, New Delhi (1983)
 
 
 Selby, Martha Ann (2011) Tamil Love Poetry: The Five Hundred Short Poems of the Aiṅkuṟunūṟu, an Early Third-Century Anthology. Columbia University Press, 

 
 
 

Sangam literature